Statistics of Qatar Stars League for the 1987–88 season.

Overview
Al-Sadd Sports Club won the championship.

References
Qatar - List of final tables (RSSSF)

1987–88 in Asian association football leagues
1987–88 in Qatari football